Sarika Singh (born 9 August 1980)  is an Indian politician and member of Lok Sabha. She was elected to 15th Lok Sabha from Hathras in Uttar Pradesh as a candidate of Rashtriya Lok Dal (RLD).
She has joined Bharatiya Janata Party.

She was nominated as a Lok Sabha Candidate of Samajwadi Party from Agra. However, she was expelled from the party after her husband was overheard calling Party Chief Mulayam Singh Yadav an Old Man.

References

 rediff

External links
 Sarika Singh Baghel, Official homepage

Rashtriya Lok Dal politicians
India MPs 2009–2014
Living people
People from Hathras district
Women in Uttar Pradesh politics
1980 births
Lok Sabha members from Uttar Pradesh
People from Etawah
21st-century Indian women politicians
21st-century Indian politicians
Bharatiya Janata Party politicians from Uttar Pradesh
Samajwadi Party politicians from Uttar Pradesh